Walworth Common in Surrey was a cricket venue known to have been used in the 18th century. There are no records of matches on the common after 1732 but a later venue in the area was Aram's New Ground, also known as the Bee Hive Ground, the home of Montpelier Cricket Club from 1796.

In June 1743 a game was played between a team from Bermondsey and one from Deptford & the King's Yard. F. S. Ashley-Cooper explained that Walworth Common was situated where Westmoreland Road, Faraday Street and Mann Street stood in 1900. He said the ground was "about three-quarters of a mile from where Montpelier Cricket Club's Bee Hive Ground afterwards existed".

References

1730 establishments in England
Cricket grounds in Surrey
Defunct cricket grounds in England
Defunct sports venues in Surrey
English cricket venues in the 18th century
Sports venues completed in 1730